The Anglo-Saxon Chronicle records a battle fought in the year 591 at Woden's Barrow (Old English "Wōdnesbeorġ"), the neolithic long barrow now known as Adam's Grave, near Marlborough, Wiltshire. The year entry states: "Her micel wælfill wæs æt Woddes beorge, 7 Ceawlin wæs ut adrifen." (There was great slaughter at Woden's hill, and Ceawlin was driven out.)

Ceawlin was king of Anglo-Saxon Wessex. In most versions of the Anglo-Saxon Chronicle the entry does not record the identity of the force opposing Ceawlin but one version, Manuscript E, says they were Britons. Yorke, however, says the opponent was Ceol, Ceawlin's nephew. Ceawlin is recorded as dying the following year and was succeeded by Ceol; his son Cuthwine went into exile.

The Chronicle records a second battle on the same site in the year 715. The area was of strategic importance since it lay near the intersection of the ancient Ridgeway with Wansdyke.

References

External links
 

592
6th century in England
Woden's Burg (592)
Woden's Burg
Woden's Burg
Woden's Burg (592)